is a former Japanese footballer who plays for Grulla Morioka.

Career
After a brief career between Osaka and Tottori, Inamori signed for Grulla Morioka and enjoyed just one season there before retiring at the end of the year.

Club statistics
Updated to 23 February 2019.

References

External links

Profile at Gainare Tottori

1994 births
Living people
Association football people from Osaka Prefecture
Japanese footballers
J1 League players
J2 League players
J3 League players
Gamba Osaka players
Gainare Tottori players
Iwate Grulla Morioka players
Association football defenders
People from Hirakata